Jeanne Tripier (1869–1944) was a French medium who produced works of text, drawing and embroidery under Spiritualist influence. She is considered part of the Art Brut canon.

Life

Jeanne Tripier was born in 1869 in Paris. Daughter of a wine merchant, she spent her childhood in the country with her grandmother. As an adult she lived in the Montmartre district of Paris, working as a salesgirl at a department store. At 58 she developed a passion for Spiritualist doctrines and divination. These activities became central to her existence, so much so that she eventually stopped going to work. In 1934 she was admitted to a psychiatric hospital in Paris.

Work
Jeanne Tripier began creating works which blended image and text when she was in her 50s.  Tripier's work emerged during trance states and utilized materials such as sugar and hair dye. She also produced figurative embroidery pieces. She ascribed responsibility for her output of texts, drawings, and embroideries to spiritual entities.

Collections and exhibits

Jeanne Tripier's work is primarily held in the Collection de l'Art Brut museum in Lausanne, Switzerland. Her works have been lent to other institutions for exhibitions, including the 2015 exhibit Art Brut in America: The Incursion of Jean Dubuffet at the American Folk Art Museum.

Recognition
Jean Dubuffet acquired Tripier's work for his Collection de l'Art Brut.

Bibliography 

 Écrits d’Art Brut. Graphomanes extravagants, Lucienne Peiry, Paris, Le Seuil, 2020.  (ISBN 978-2-02-144768-2)

References

External links
 TRIPIER jeanne

1869 births
1944 deaths
20th-century French women artists
Artists from Paris
Draughtsmen
Outsider artists
Women outsider artists
Spiritual mediums
Drawing mediums
French embroiderers